George Huang (27 August 1935 – 6 May 2022) was a Taiwanese politician. He served two consecutive terms as Changhua County Magistrate from 1981 to 1989 and also chaired the Central Election Commission twice from 1994 to 1995 and between 1999 and 2004.

Huang's daughter, Lisa, has served on the Legislative Yuan. His son David has worked for the Mainland Affairs Council. Outside of politics, Huang served as president of the Chinese Taipei Soccer Association. He also wrote for the Taipei Times. Huang died on 6 May 2022, aged 88.

References

1935 births
2022 deaths
Magistrates of Changhua County
Soochow University (Taiwan) alumni
Taiwanese people of Hoklo descent